Porpax is a genus of epiphytic orchids native to southern and southeastern Asia from India to Yunnan to Borneo. , Plants of the World Online accepts the following species:

Porpax albiflora (Rolfe) Schuit., Y.P.Ng & H.A.Pedersen
Porpax angustifolia (Mansf.) Schuit., Y.P.Ng & H.A.Pedersen
Porpax articulata (Lindl.) Schuit., Y.P.Ng & H.A.Pedersen
Porpax atrorubra (Mansf.) Schuit., Y.P.Ng & H.A.Pedersen
Porpax borneensis J.J.Wood & A.L.Lamb
Porpax braccata (Lindl.) Schuit., Y.P.Ng & H.A.Pedersen
Porpax bulbophylloides (C.Schweinf.) Schuit., Y.P.Ng & H.A.Pedersen
Porpax capuccinorum Aver.
Porpax christopheri (P.J.Cribb) Schuit., Y.P.Ng & H.A.Pedersen
Porpax compacta (P.J.Cribb) Schuit., Y.P.Ng & H.A.Pedersen
Porpax conica (Summerh.) Schuit., Y.P.Ng & H.A.Pedersen
Porpax cupuligera (Kraenzl.) Schuit., Y.P.Ng & H.A.Pedersen
Porpax dickasonii (Ormerod) Schuit., Y.P.Ng & H.A.Pedersen
Porpax elaidium (Lindl.) Schuit., Y.P.Ng & H.A.Pedersen
Porpax elwesii (Rchb.f.) Rolfe
Porpax exilis (Hook.f.) Schuit., Y.P.Ng & H.A.Pedersen
Porpax extinctoria (Lindl.) Schuit., Y.P.Ng & H.A.Pedersen
Porpax fibuliformis (King & Pantl.) King & Pantl.
Porpax filiformis (Wight) Schuit., Y.P.Ng & H.A.Pedersen
Porpax gigantea Deori
Porpax grandiflora Seidenf.
Porpax heiligenthalii (Eb.Fisch., Killmann, J.-P.Lebel & Delep.) Schuit., Y.P.Ng & H.A.Pedersen
Porpax jerdoniana (Wight) Rolfe
Porpax kalkhof-roseae (Eb.Fisch., Killmann, J.-P.Lebel & Delep.) Schuit., Y.P.Ng & H.A.Pedersen
Porpax karikouyensis (Schltr.) Schuit., Y.P.Ng & H.A.Pedersen
Porpax lacei (Summerh.) Schuit., Y.P.Ng & H.A.Pedersen
Porpax lanii Seidenf.
Porpax laosensis Aver.
Porpax lasiorhiza (Schltr.) Schuit., Y.P.Ng & H.A.Pedersen
Porpax leedalii (P.J.Cribb) Schuit., Y.P.Ng & H.A.Pedersen
Porpax macrantha Schuit., Y.P.Ng & H.A.Pedersen
Porpax meirax (C.S.P.Parish & Rchb.f.) King & Pantl.
Porpax microchilos (Dalzell) Schuit., Y.P.Ng & H.A.Pedersen
Porpax moniliformis (P.J.Cribb) Schuit., Y.P.Ng & H.A.Pedersen
Porpax muscicola (Lindl.) Schuit., Y.P.Ng & H.A.Pedersen
Porpax nana (A.Rich.) Schuit., Y.P.Ng & H.A.Pedersen
Porpax nyassana (Schltr.) Schuit., Y.P.Ng & H.A.Pedersen
Porpax oligantha (Mansf.) Schuit., Y.P.Ng & H.A.Pedersen
Porpax parishii (Lindl. & Rchb.f.) Rolfe
Porpax peperomioides (Kraenzl.) Schuit., Y.P.Ng & H.A.Pedersen
Porpax pusilla (Griff.) Schuit., Y.P.Ng & H.A.Pedersen
Porpax repens (Rolfe) Schuit., Y.P.Ng & H.A.Pedersen
Porpax reticulata Lindl.
Porpax scaposa Seidenf.
Porpax seidenfadenii A.N.Rao
Porpax sikkimensis (Bajrach. & K.K.Shrestha) Schuit., Y.P.Ng & H.A.Pedersen
Porpax spirodela (Aver.) Schuit., Y.P.Ng & H.A.Pedersen
Porpax summerhayesiana (A.D.Hawkes & A.H.Heller) Schuit., Y.P.Ng & H.A.Pedersen
Porpax thaithongiae Suddee, Promm. & Watthana
Porpax ustulata (C.S.P.Parish & Rchb.f.) Rolfe
Porpax verrucosa Schuit.
Porpax viridis (P.J.Cribb) Schuit., Y.P.Ng & H.A.Pedersen
Porpax williamsonii (P.J.Cribb) Schuit., Y.P.Ng & H.A.Pedersen

References

External links 

Podochileae genera
Epiphytic orchids
 
Taxa named by John Lindley